Stephen Hickey may refer to:

 Stephen Hickey (diplomat), British diplomat
 Steve Hickey (footballer) (born 1965), Australian rules footballer